Bruce Patrick McNall (born April 17, 1950) is an American former Thoroughbred racehorse owner, sports executive, and convicted felon who once owned the Los Angeles Kings of the National Hockey League (NHL) and the Toronto Argonauts of the Canadian Football League (CFL).

McNall claimed to have made his initial fortune as a coin collector, though Metropolitan Museum of Art director Thomas Hoving claimed he smuggled art antiquities as the partner of Robert E. Hecht. In the 1980s McNall produced several Hollywood movies, including The Manhattan Project and Weekend at Bernie's.

McNall bought a 25 percent stake in the Kings from Jerry Buss in 1986, and bought an additional 24 percent in 1987 to become the team's largest shareholder. He was named team president that September, and purchased Buss' remaining shares in March 1988. He then shocked the sports world on August 9, 1988 when he acquired the NHL's biggest star, Wayne Gretzky, along with Marty McSorley and Mike Krushelnyski, from the Edmonton Oilers for Jimmy Carson, Martin Gelinas, three first-round draft choices and US$15 million. McNall raised Gretzky's annual salary from less than $1 million to $3 million, which, in turn, triggered a dramatic rise in NHL salaries throughout the 1990s.

In 1992, McNall was elected chairman of the NHL Board of Governors—the league's second-highest post.

In 1991, McNall, Gretzky and actor/comedian John Candy purchased the CFL's Toronto Argonauts. Prior to the 1991 season, McNall enticed Raghib "Rocket" Ismail away from the National Football League by signing him to a four-year contract for a then-unheard-of $18.2 million. Although Ismail led the Argonauts to the 1991 Grey Cup championship, he returned to the U.S. after two seasons in Toronto.

At one point, he also owned the finest copy of the most expensive baseball card, Honus Wagner's 1909 T206 card.

Thoroughbred racing
McNall also owned Thoroughbred race horses and in 1990 won France's most prestigious race, the Prix de l'Arc de Triomphe, with the colt Saumarez. He also owned a 50% interest in Trempolino when the French colt won the Prix de l'Arc de Triomphe in 1987. He was also a partner with Wayne Gretzky in the colt Golden Pheasant who won races in Europe as well as the Arlington Million in the U.S. and the Japan Cup at Tokyo Racecourse.

Decline
In December 1993, McNall defaulted on a $90 million loan, and Bank of America threatened to force the Kings into bankruptcy unless he sold the team. He sold controlling interest in the Kings in May 1994 and resigned as chairman of the board of governors, though he still remained as president and governor of the Kings for a time. Shortly afterward, he granted an interview to Vanity Fair in which he admitted smuggling many of his prized coins out of foreign countries.  His claim of graduating from the University of Oxford was also debunked.

On December 14, 1993, McNall pleaded guilty to five counts of conspiracy and fraud, and admitted to bilking six banks out of $236 million over a ten-year period.  He was sentenced to 70 months in prison. Immediately after his conviction, it emerged that his free-spending ways had put the Kings in serious financial jeopardy.  They were ultimately forced into bankruptcy in 1995.  The financial problems from the McNall era plagued the Kings for several years afterward.

McNall was released in 2001 after his sentence was reduced by 13 months for good behavior. He was on probation until 2006. McNall remained on good terms with many of his former players, with Wayne Gretzky, Rob Blake, Luc Robitaille and others visiting him in prison. Gretzky even refused to allow the Kings to retire his number 99 until McNall could attend the ceremony. McNall also attended Robitaille's uniform retirement ceremony in 2007. He credited his celebrity friends who supported him. Kurt Russell and Goldie Hawn visited, "Michael Eisner, who suggested I write the book and bought it, always took my call", while "Dick Zanuck was always there, Tom Hanks would write to me, Bert Fields would send his books, and Barry Kemp wrote long letters. They kept me going."

McNall's autobiography, Fun While It Lasted: My Rise and Fall in the Land of Fame and Fortune, was published by Hyperion Books in 2003. In 2004, McNall became co-chair of A-Mark Entertainment. He took a role with Peter M. Hoffman at Seven Arts Pictures in 2003 and is credited on Nick Cassavetes' 2012 movie, Yellow.

References

1950 births
Living people
American numismatists
American people convicted of fraud
American racehorse owners and breeders
Lester Patrick Trophy recipients
Los Angeles Kings owners
Toronto Argonauts owners
National Hockey League executives
National Hockey League owners
People from Arcadia, California
Owners of Prix de l'Arc de Triomphe winners